Lius Pongoh (born December 3, 1960 in Jakarta) is a former Indonesian badminton player.

Career
Pongoh played singles at a world class level in the 1980s. At nineteen he was a bronze medalist at the 1980 IBF World Championships in Jakarta, losing in the semifinals to fellow countryman Liem Swie King. On the international badminton circuit Pongoh's wins included the Swedish (1981),  Indonesia (1984), and Chinese Taipei (1985) Opens, the 1981 Copenhagen Cup (forerunner of the Copenhagen Masters), and the 1982 Indian Masters. He won men's doubles at the 1981 Japan Open with doubles maestro Christian Hadinata where he was also runner-up in singles to the great Rudy Hartono.

Pongoh played second singles for the Indonesian Thomas Cup (men's international) teams of 1982 and 1986, both of which suffered the narrowest of final round losses to arch-rival China. He dropped both of his matches in the '82 series final, but won his only match (under a revised best of five match format) in the '86 series.

Achievements

IBF World Championships 
Men's Singles

International tournaments 
Men's Singles

Men's doubles

References

Indonesian male badminton players
1960 births
Living people
Asian Games medalists in badminton
Badminton players at the 1986 Asian Games
Minahasa people
Asian Games bronze medalists for Indonesia
Medalists at the 1986 Asian Games
Sportspeople from Jakarta
21st-century Indonesian people
20th-century Indonesian people